Shivya Pathania is an Indian model and television actress known for playing Sita in the Indian mythological TV series Ram Siya Ke Luv Kush and Radha in RadhaKrishn.

Early life 
Her father, Subhash Pathania, was a law officer in the Labour and Employment Department in Shimla.

Career
Before acting, Shivya was crowned Miss Shimla 2013 at the International Summer Festival which took place in Shimla. Pathania also won Miss Oye and Miss Beautiful Smile.

A year later, she debuted in television playing Aarzoo Sheikh Mahajan in Humsafars opposite Harshad Chopda. In 2016, she played Zara Khan in Yeh Hai Aashiqui and gained wide praise for portraying Sanchi Mittal in Sony's Ek Rishta Saajhedari Ka, co-starring Kinshuk Vaidya.

From 2017 to 2018, Pathania appeared as Raavi Kaur in Zee TV's Dil Dhoondta Hai. She then starred as Radha in Star Bharat's RadhaKrishn opposite Himanshu Soni and appeared as Priya in &TV's Laal Ishq, followed by a cameo appearance in Vikram Betaal Ki Rahasya Gatha.

Next, she portrayed Sita in Colors TV's Ram Siya Ke Luv Kush from 2019 to 2020, again opposite Himanshu Soni.

Filmography

Television

Web series

Music videos

References

External links 
 
 

Living people
Indian television actresses
Actresses from Himachal Pradesh
Year of birth missing (living people)